Dichocrocis tigridalis is a moth of the family Crambidae. It can be found in Madagascar.

References

Moths described in 1900
Spilomelinae
Moths of Madagascar
Moths of Africa